Pathsala railway station is the single railway station in Pathsala, in Bajali district of Assam, India. It is under the Northeast Frontier Railway zone.

References

Railway stations in Barpeta district